Federico Allasio (30 May 1914 – 27 May 1987) was an Italian footballer who was midfielder and manager from Turin. He started his footballing career with hometown side Torino, before going on to play for Genoa and Suzzara.

He was father of actress Marisa Allasio.

Honours
1935–36 Coppa Italia (Torino).

References

1914 births
1987 deaths
Footballers from Turin
Italian footballers
Association football midfielders
Torino F.C. players
Genoa C.F.C. players
Serie A players
Serie B players
Genoa C.F.C. managers
Cagliari Calcio managers
S.S. Lazio managers
Hellas Verona F.C. managers
Torino F.C. managers
U.S. Alessandria Calcio 1912 managers
Italian football managers